Peerapat Kaminthong (born  March 22, 2000), is a Thai professional footballer who plays as a midfielder for Thai League 1 club Police Tero.

Honour

International
Thailand U-19
 2017 AFF U-19 Youth Championship: Champion

References

External links
 

1997 births
Living people
Peerapat Kaminthong
Peerapat Kaminthong
Peerapat Kaminthong
Association football midfielders
Peerapat Kaminthong
Peerapat Kaminthong